Eddie Clarence Murray (born February 24, 1956), nicknamed "Steady Eddie," is an American former Major League Baseball (MLB) first baseman, designated hitter, and coach. Spending most of his MLB career with the Baltimore Orioles, he ranks fourth in team history in both games played and hits. Though Murray never won a Most Valuable Player (MVP) Award, he finished in the top ten in MVP voting several times. He had 996 runs batted in in the 1980s, more than any other player. After his playing career, Murray coached for the Orioles, Cleveland Indians and Los Angeles Dodgers.

Murray is one of only seven players in MLB history to be in both the 3,000 hit club and the 500 home run club. In the New Bill James Historical Baseball Abstract (2001), Murray is described as the fifth-best first baseman in major league history. He was 77th on the list of the Baseball's 100 Greatest Players by The Sporting News (1998).

Early life
Murray was the eighth child of twelve and still has five sisters and four brothers. He has often quipped that as a child he did not have to go far for a pick-up baseball game. The games were quite fierce and his older brothers never let him win. Murray played Little League baseball under coach Clifford Prelow, an ex-Dodger minor leaguer. (In his Hall of Fame induction speech, Murray thanked Prelow for teaching him not just the game of baseball, but love for the game as well.) Prelow remembers that young Murray was a well behaved player. Murray attended Locke High School in Los Angeles, where he batted .500 as a senior and was a teammate of Ozzie Smith.

Playing career

Baltimore Orioles (1977–1988)
Murray was selected by the Baltimore Orioles in the third round of the 1973 amateur draft and had several successful seasons in the minor leagues. He debuted at the major league level on April 7, 1977, and played in 160 games for the Orioles in his first season. In 160 games, he hit for .283 while contributing 88 RBIs, 27 home runs, 29 doubles, and 173 hits while also striking out 104 times during the season. This was the only season in which he struck out over 100 times. He won the American League Rookie of the Year award. In his next season, he played in 161 games while raising his totals, hitting for .285 along with having 95 RBIs, 27 home runs, 32 doubles, 174 hits along with being named to his first All-Star Game and finishing 8th in the MVP balloting. In the 1979 season, he hit .295 along with driving in 99 runs, 25 home runs, 30 doubles and 179 hits in 159 games. Though he was not named to the All-Star Game, he finished 11th in the MVP balloting. He participated in his first postseason. In the 1979 American League Championship Series, he hit 5-for-12 for a .417 batting average along with one home run and 5 RBIs as they beat the California Angels in four games. In the 1979 World Series, he hit 4-for-26 for a .154 average with one home run and 2 RBIs but also four strikeouts as the Orioles lost to the Pittsburgh Pirates in seven games.

With the Orioles from 1977 until 1988, Murray averaged 28 home runs and 99 RBI, making him a perennial candidate for the MVP award, twice finishing second in the voting. Murray's close-knit friendship with fellow Oriole Cal Ripken Jr. was highly publicized in Baltimore at the time. In fact, Ripken has credited Murray with teaching him his work ethic.

In the 1980 season, he hit .300 (a career first), having 116 RBIs, 32 home runs, 36 doubles, and 179 hits in 158 games.  He finished 6th in the MVP balloting that year. While only playing in 99 games due to the player's strike, in 1981 Murray hit .294 along with 78 RBIs (which led the American League), 22 home runs (tied for the American League lead), 21 doubles and 111 hits while being named to the 1981 Major League Baseball All-Star Game and finishing 5th in the MVP balloting. He returned to full form the following year, hitting for .316 along with 110 RBIs, 32 home runs, 30 doubles, and 174 hits in 151 games. He was named to the 1982 Major League Baseball All-Star Game along with being awarded his first-ever Gold Glove Award and finishing 2nd in the MVP balloting.

His 1983 season was not much different, as he hit .306/.393/.538 along with 111 RBIs, 33 home runs (a career-high), 30 doubles, and 178 hits in 156 games. He was named to the 1983 Major League Baseball All-Star Game along with winning a second consecutive Golden Glove and his first Silver Slugger Award. Though a spectacular season, he finished second in the MVP voting to teammate Cal Ripken, Jr.. In the 1983 American League Championship Series against the Chicago White Sox, he hit 4-for-15 for a .267 batting average, hitting one home run and three RBIs as the Orioles advanced in four games to go to the 1983 World Series. In that series, he hit 5-for-20 for a .250 average while also hitting two home runs and three RBIs as the Orioles beat the Philadelphia Phillies in five games. This was his only world championship along with his last postseason appearance for 12 years.

In the 1984 season, he played in all 162 games (a career-high), while hitting for .306 and having 110 RBIs, 29 home runs, 26 doubles, and 180 hits. He also was walked a career-high 107 times. He was named to a fourth straight All-Star Game, while being awarded a third straight Gold Glove and second straight Silver Slugger Award and finishing 4th in the MVP balloting. The following year, he hit for .297 while having 124 RBIs, 31 home runs, 37 doubles (a career-best) and 173 hits in 156 games. He was named to his fifth straight All-Star Game while finishing 5th in the MVP balloting. The 1986 season (his tenth with the Orioles) was a slight regression, though he hit .305 with 84 RBIs, 17 home runs, 25 doubles and 151 hits in 137 games. He was named to the All-Star Game once again.. This was his last selection until 1991. The following year, he hit for .277 while having 91 RBIs, 30 home runs, 28 doubles, and 171 hits in 160 games. This was the first season in which he had more strikeouts than walks (78 to 75) since 1983 (a 90:86 ratio). In the 1988 season, he hit for .284 while having 84 RBIs, 27 doubles and 171 hits in 161 games.

Murray's relationship with Orioles management began to sour during spring training in 1986 when he accused team officials of pressuring him to return prematurely from an ankle injury. His request to be traded in late-August of that year was fueled by criticism from team owner Edward Bennett Williams who questioned his off-season work habits, defense and lack of extra base hits, a veiled attempt at accusing Murray of laziness. Such racism factored into the lack of appreciation he received from baseball fans and media. He was traded to the Los Angeles Dodgers for Ken Howell, Brian Holton and Juan Bell on December 4, 1988. The Orioles also paid $1 million of the $8 million he was owed for the final three years of his contract. The Baltimore Sun sports columnist Mike Preston called Murray's departure from Baltimore in 1988 "one of the lowest moments in this city's sports history, as sad as the Colts leaving for Indianapolis, and as embarrassing as Colts officials allowing quarterback John Unitas to wear a San Diego Chargers uniform."

Los Angeles Dodgers (1989–1991)
In his first season with the team, he hit for a career-low .247 while having 88 RBIs, 20 home runs, 29 doubles and 147 hits in 160 games. The following year, he improved to a .330 average while having 95 RBIs, 26 home runs, 22 doubles and 184 hits in 155 games. He had 64 strikeouts (his lowest since 49 in 1986) while having 87 walks, the most since he had 84 in 1985. He was awarded the Silver Slugger Award for the third and final time while finishing 5th in the MVP balloting. He lost the NL batting title to Willie McGee by a narrow margin; McGee had been traded from the St. Louis Cardinals to the Oakland Athletics but had enough plate appearances to qualify for the batting title, hitting .335 to Murray's .330, though McGee hit .274 with the A's (making his season average .324), which meant that Murray led the major leagues in batting despite not winning the NL batting title. The 1991 season was his last with the Dodgers. He hit for .260 while having 96 RBIs, 19 home runs, 23 doubles and 150 hits in 153 games. He had 74 strikeouts along with 55 walks (the lowest since having 40 in the injury-shortened year of 1981). Despite this, he was named to the 1991 Major League Baseball All-Star Game. On October 29, 1991, he was granted free agency.

New York Mets (1992–1993)
On November 27, 1991, Murray signed a two-year deal with the New York Mets. Murray was one of several acquisitions the Mets made (including Bobby Bonilla, Willie Randolph, and Bret Saberhagen) to try to regain their winning ways. However, in Murray's two years with the team they finished with 90 and 103 losses, respectively. He hit for .261 while having 93 RBIs, 16 home runs, 37 doubles and 144 hits in 156 games for 1992. Murray hit his 400th career home run on May 3 against Marvin Freeman of the Atlanta Braves. In the following year, he hit for .285 while having 100 RBIs (a team-high and his first 100 RBI season since having 124 in 1985), 27 home runs (second on the team only to Bonilla), 28 doubles and 174 hits in 154 games. Murray was one of three Mets to hit 20 or more home runs that year, with Bonilla hitting 34 and Jeff Kent hitting 20. This was the last time in his career that Murray hit the 100 RBI mark.

On November 1, 1993, he was granted free agency by the Mets.

Cleveland Indians (1994-1996)
Murray was signed as a free agent by the Cleveland Indians on December 2, 1993. In the 1994 season, he played in 108 games and had a .254 batting average along with 76 RBIs, 17 home runs and 110 hits before the season was cut short due to the strike. The following year, he played in 113 games while having a .323 batting average for 82 RBIs, 21 home runs, and 141 hits.  Murray reached the 3,000-hit plateau as an Indian on June 30, 1995, at the Hubert H. Humphrey Metrodome with a single to right field off Minnesota Twins pitcher Mike Trombley. In the 1995 American League Division Series, he hit 5-for-13 for a .385 batting average while having one home run and 3 RBIs as they swept the Boston Red Sox in three games. In the 1995 American League Championship Series, he hit 6-for-24 while having a home run and 3 RBIs as the Indians beat the Seattle Mariners to advance to the 1995 World Series. In that series, he hit 2-for-19 for a .105 batting average. One of his hits was a single in the bottom of the 11th inning of Game 3 off of Alejandro Peña to score Álvaro Espinoza and give the Indians a crucial win. He had two other RBIs along with a home run shot in Game 2 that scored two runs. However, the Indians lost to the Atlanta Braves in six games. Murray's 1996 season was shared between two teams, the Indians and the Orioles. He played a total of 152 games, hitting for .260 with 79 RBIs, 22 home runs along with 147 hits. He played in 88 total games for the Indians, hitting for .262 along with 45 RBIs, 12 home runs and 88 hits. The Indians traded Murray back to Baltimore on July 21, 1996, for pitcher Kent Mercker.

Last seasons (1996–1997)
He played in 64 games for the Orioles, hitting for .257, 34 RBIs, 10 home runs and 59 hits. On September 6, 1996, he hit his 500th career home run off Felipe Lira—fittingly, the home run came as a member of the Orioles, and also came exactly one year to the day that Ripken had broken Lou Gehrig's streak of 2,130 consecutive games played. Having already reached the 3,000 hits plateau the previous season, Murray joined Willie Mays and Hank Aaron as the only players ever to have hit at least 500 home runs and amassed 3,000 or more hits in their careers. Rafael Palmeiro,  Alex Rodriguez, Albert Pujols, and Miguel Cabrera have since joined the club. He participated in the Orioles' playoff run, as the team advanced to the ALCS against the Yankees after having beat his old team Cleveland in the ALDS. In nine total postseason games, he went 10-for-30 while hitting one home run.  After being granted free agency by the Orioles, Murray was signed as a free agent by the Anaheim Angels on December 18, 1996. He played 55 total games in the 1997 season, 46 with the Angels and 9 with the Dodgers. He had a .219 batting average along with 15 RBIs, 3 home runs, and 35 hits. His last home run was with the Angels, hitting one off Bob Tewksbury in the second inning in a 4–3 loss. He was released by the Angels on August 14. On August 20, he was signed by the Dodgers. In nine total games with the Dodgers, he had a .286 batting average, 3 RBIs and 2 hits. On October 30, he was granted free agency.  He retired after the 1997 season with 504 home runs; as of 2021, Mickey Mantle is the only switch-hitter who has hit more home runs (536). Murray hit a home run from both sides of the plate in 11 games; he retired tied with Chili Davis for first place in this category. This co-record has since been broken by Mark Teixeira.

Coaching career
After playing 21 major-league seasons. Murray became a coach, first with the Baltimore Orioles, serving as bench coach in 1998 and 1999 and as first-base coach in 2000 and 2001.

Murray then served as the hitting coach for the Cleveland Indians from 2002 to 2005. He was with the Indians when inducted into the Hall of Fame.

Murray accepted the position of hitting coach with the Los Angeles Dodgers in 2006. On June 14, 2007, Murray was fired. The Dodgers had just come off a three-game sweep of the New York Mets and had produced 31 hits and 18 runs. Former Dodger player Bill Mueller was named as interim replacement.

Outside baseball
In the 1980s, Murray made a donation to the Baltimore City Parks and Recreation Department which led to the establishment of the Carrie Murray Nature Center, named after Murray's late mother. In 2008, Murray released a charity wine called Eddie Murray 504 Cabernet, a nod to his 504 career home runs, with all of his proceeds donated to the Baltimore Community Foundation.

On August 17, 2012, the U.S. Securities and Exchange Commission charged Murray with insider trading.  The SEC alleged, in a civil claim, that Murray had "made approximately $235,314 in illegal profits after Illinois-based Abbott Laboratories Inc. publicly announced its plan to purchase Advanced Medical Optics through a tender offer."  Specifically, the SEC alleged that Murray had received a "tip" about the impending purchase offer before the offer was publicly announced, bought stock in Advanced Medical Optics because of the tip, and then sold the stock for the profits after the stock increased in value after Abbott Laboratories' plans were publicly announced.  According to the SEC, Murray received the tip from former Baltimore Orioles teammate Doug DeCinces, with whom he remained close friends after their playing careers ended. One year earlier, DeCinces had agreed to pay $2.5 million to settle the SEC's civil insider trading charges against him in the same case. Murray agreed to settle the SEC's civil charges by paying a total of $358,151, without admitting or denying any wrongdoing.

Legacy

In 1998, he ranked number 77 on The Sporting News list of Baseball's 100 Greatest Players, and was nominated as a finalist for the Major League Baseball All-Century Team.

On Sunday, July 27, 2003, Murray, along with Gary Carter, was inducted into Major League Baseball's Hall of Fame. More than 30,000 people heard Murray talk about how hard it was to get to the Hall of Fame.  He said that he was never about one person, but about the team.  He thanked the "sea of black and orange" in the crowd and then pointed to the kids farthest in the back; (more than 300 inner-city little leaguers had come from Baltimore's Northwood Baseball League) and told them that one day "they would be here too".

Murray was named the fifth best first baseman in major league history in the New Bill James Historical Abstract (2010).

A bronze statue of Eddie Murray's left-handed-hitting stance was unveiled at Oriole Park at Camden Yards on August 11, 2012.

Union Craft Brewery in Baltimore makes "Steady Eddie," a wheat IPA named after Murray.

Career stats – regular season

Accomplishments

 8-time All-Star (1978, 1981–86, 1991)
 Finished second in American League MVP voting (1982, 1983)
 Finished fourth in American League MVP voting (1984)
 Finished fifth in American League MVP voting (1981, 1985)
 Finished fifth in National League MVP voting (1990)
 Finished sixth in American League MVP voting (1980)
 Finished eighth in American League MVP voting (1978)
 Most RBI (1,917) among switch-hitters all-time
 Holds the career record for most sacrifice flies (128)
 Holds the career record for most assists by a first baseman (1865)
 His season-high for home runs, 33, is the lowest of any player with over 500 career home runs
 One of only six players to have both 3,000 career hits and 500 home runs (others are Hank Aaron, Willie Mays, Alex Rodriguez, Albert Pujols and Rafael Palmeiro)
 Hit 19 grand slams (fourth all-time, behind Alex Rodriguez's 25, Lou Gehrig’s 23, and Manny Ramírez's 21).
 Career batting average in 238 at-bats with the bases loaded is .399 with 298 RBI and a .739 slugging percentage.
 Hit home runs from both sides of the plate in the same game 11 times, an all-time record (since surpassed by Mark Texeira).
 Hit 3 home runs in a game three times (1979, 1980, 1985).
 His 222 intentional walks ranks sixth all time.
 Ranks fourth in hits for the Baltimore Orioles.
 Ranks second in home runs for the Orioles.
 Ranks fourth in games played for Baltimore.

See also

 List of Major League Baseball home run records
 List of Major League Baseball doubles records
 500 home run club
 List of Major League Baseball career home run leaders
 3,000 hit club
 List of Major League Baseball career hits leaders
 List of Major League Baseball career doubles leaders
 List of Major League Baseball career runs scored leaders
 List of Major League Baseball career runs batted in leaders
 List of Major League Baseball annual runs batted in leaders
 List of Major League Baseball annual home run leaders

References

External links 

 Baltimore Sun Gallery and archive – Eddie Murray
 500 Home Run Club
 Video of Hall of Fame Speech
 Eddie Murray Biography at Baseball Biography

1956 births
Living people
African-American baseball coaches
African-American baseball players
Albuquerque Dukes players
American League All-Stars
American League home run champions
American League RBI champions
American sportsmen
Anaheim Angels players
Asheville Orioles players
Baltimore Orioles coaches
Baltimore Orioles players
Baseball players from Los Angeles
Bluefield Orioles players
Charlotte O's players
Cleveland Indians coaches
Cleveland Indians players
Gold Glove Award winners
Lake Elsinore Storm players
Los Angeles Dodgers coaches
Los Angeles Dodgers players
National Baseball Hall of Fame inductees
Major League Baseball bench coaches
Major League Baseball first base coaches
Major League Baseball first basemen
Major League Baseball hitting coaches
Major League Baseball players with retired numbers
Major League Baseball Rookie of the Year Award winners
Miami Orioles players
National League All-Stars
New York Mets players
Rochester Red Wings players
Silver Slugger Award winners
21st-century African-American people
20th-century African-American sportspeople